Le Petit Français illustré was a French newspaper for schoolchildren established in 1889, consisting mainly of soap-opera-like stories ("feuilletons"). From its beginnings through 1904, it featured a number of bandes dessinées (comic strips) by France's pioneering comic artist Georges Colomb (under the pseudonym "Christophe"), which were popular with educated adults as well as children. Artists such as Albert Robida contributed.

External links 
 Le Petit Français illustré online in Gallica, the digital library of the BnF.

1889 establishments in France
Newspapers established in 1889
Children's literature organizations
Comics magazines published in France
Children's magazines published in France
Defunct newspapers published in France